Andrew Johnson (born in London, 1955) is a British actor of South Asian descent.

He is most famous for being one of the original cast members of EastEnders, playing the shop-keeper Saeed Jeffery from the first episode in February 1985 until December 1985. During his time on the show, Johnson's troubled character struggled in an arranged marriage to an unwilling wife, Naima (played by Shreela Ghosh).

After leaving EastEnders Johnson moved to Hollywood, but a successful film career failed to materialise. He eventually got minor roles in the amateur detective series Murder She Wrote and later in the ITV drama, Inspector Morse. In 2005 he appeared in the low-budget film Secret Agent 420.

Filmography

External links 

British male soap opera actors
Living people
1955 births
Male actors from London
British male actors of South Asian descent